McDull, Prince de la Bun (literal title: McDull, the prince of the Pineapple bun with butter) is a 2004 Hong Kong animated comedy-drama film directed by Toe Yuen. Telling the story of the life of the fictional pig McDull, it is a sequel to My Life as McDull (2001) and it was followed by McDull, the Alumni (2006).

There is significant word play in the film, some of it based on the "pineapple bun". For example, in slang Cantonese, a "bor lo goi" ("pineapple cap") is a colloquialism for kneecap. The Pancakes, who composed the film's theme song gum gum gum (Cantonese: 咁咁咁, literally "this, this, this"), was awarded Best Original Film Song  in the 24th Hong Kong Film Awards.

Voice cast

External links
 

2004 films
2004 animated films
2004 comedy-drama films
Hong Kong animated films
Hong Kong comedy-drama films
Hong Kong sequel films
Chinese children's films
McDull
Animated films about animals
Films set in Hong Kong
2000s Hong Kong films